was a Japanese physician. She was the first Japanese woman to obtain a degree in Western medicine from a Western university (Women's Medical College of Pennsylvania, USA).

Early life 
Kei Okami was born as Nishida Keiko in Aomori Prefecture in 1858. She graduated from the Yokohama Kyoritsu Girls' School in 1878, and then taught English at the Sakurai Girls' School. She married an art teacher, Okami Senkichiro, at the age of 25. The couple subsequently traveled to the United States.

Medical training 
In America, Kei Okami studied at the Woman's Medical College of Pennsylvania, receiving aid from the Women's Foreign Missionary Society of the Presbyterian Church. After four years of study, she graduated in 1889, with Susan La Flesche Picotte. She thus became the first Japanese woman to obtain a degree in the Western medicine from a Western university.

Medical career 
After returning to Japan, Kei Okami also worked at the Jikei Hospital (now the Jikei University School of Medicine hospital) at the invitation of Takaki Kanehiro. She resigned because the Emperor, Meiji, refused her care because she was female. Then, she opened her own clinic, operating out of her home in Akasaka Tameike, Minato. Kei Okami worked in gynecology and also treated tuberculosis patients.

Later, she closed the practice, and served as the vice-principal of Shoei Girls' school (a predecessor of the Shoei Girls' Junior and Senior High School), which was founded by her brother-in-law Kiyomune. In 1897, she opened a small hospital for sick women in partnership with a friend, Mrs. True. She also established a school of nursing in the same premises. The hospital closed after nine years, as there were very few patients, mostly limited to foreign female preachers. Subsequently, she retired due to breast cancer. A devout Christian, she participated in missionary work in Japan, as well as teaching anatomy to nurses in one of Japan's largest hospitals.

See also 
 Ogino Ginko, who graduated from the Juntendo University in 1882.

References 

Japanese women physicians
Japanese Christians
1859 births
1941 deaths
Minato, Tokyo
People from Aomori Prefecture
Woman's Medical College of Pennsylvania alumni